Anggia Shitta Awanda (born 22 May 1994) is an Indonesian badminton player specializing in doubles, affiliated with Jaya Raya Jakarta badminton club. She was the 2011 World Junior girls' doubles silver medallist partnered with Shella Devi Aulia.

Achievements

Southeast Asian Games 
Women's doubles

BWF World Junior Championships 
Girls' doubles

BWF World Tour (1 runner-up) 
The BWF World Tour, which was announced on 19 March 2017 and implemented in 2018, is a series of elite badminton tournaments sanctioned by the Badminton World Federation (BWF). The BWF World Tour is divided into levels of World Tour Finals, Super 1000, Super 750, Super 500, Super 300 (part of the HSBC World Tour), and the BWF Tour Super 100.

Women's doubles

BWF Grand Prix (1 title, 3 runners-up) 
The BWF Grand Prix had two levels, the Grand Prix and Grand Prix Gold. It was a series of badminton tournaments sanctioned by the Badminton World Federation (BWF) and played between 2007 and 2017.

Women's doubles

  BWF Grand Prix tournament
  BWF Grand Prix Gold tournament

BWF International Challenge/Series (3 titles, 2 runners-up) 
Women's doubles

  BWF International Challenge tournament
  BWF International Series tournament

Invitational Tournament 
Women's doubles

Performance timeline

National team 
 Junior level

 Senior level

Individual competitions

Junior level 
Girls' doubles

Senior level

Women's singles

Women's doubles

Mixed doubles

Record against selected opponents 
Women's doubles results with Ni Ketut Mahadewi Istarani against World Superseries finalists, World Championships semifinalists, and Olympic quarterfinalists:

  Christinna Pedersen & Kamilla Rytter Juhl 1–0
  Nitya Krishinda Maheswari & Greysia Polii 0–1
  Lee So-hee & Shin Seung-chan 0–1
  Vivian Hoo & Woon Khe Wei 0–2

References

External links 

 

1994 births
Living people
People from Bekasi
Sportspeople from West Java
Indonesian female badminton players
Competitors at the 2015 Southeast Asian Games
Southeast Asian Games bronze medalists for Indonesia
Southeast Asian Games medalists in badminton
21st-century Indonesian women
20th-century Indonesian women